The Chennai Central–Madurai Junction Central SF Express is a Superfast express train connecting Chennai and Madurai which lies in Southern Railway zone of Tamil Nadu State in India. This train is now proposed to be extended upto Bodinayakanur via Teni since the gauge conversion of this route was completed. This was the first train operated by Southern Railways with newly manufactured AC Three Tier Economy Coach. This train will be operated from weekly to tri-weekly with effect from 10 June 2020 from Chennai and 11 June 2020 from Madurai. There is no changes in timings. It will depart from Chennai on every Monday, Wednesday and Friday. Earlier it used to run as a fully air conditioned express, but after August 2021, 4 Sleeper Class coaches were attached. Initially it ran only one day a week from Chennai Central - Madurai by sharing its rakes with Chennai Central - Madurai AC Duronto Express. After June 2020, Duronto Express was fully cancelled and it was made into run on the days which Duranto ran. Also additional stoppages were given at Katpadi, Karur, and Dindigul. In return it will leave from Madurai on every Tuesday, Thursday and Sunday. It was the first train to carry AC Three Tier Economy Coach in Southern Railway, though some trains carrying 3 Tier Economy Coach passes through Southern Railway Zone, they aren't belonged to Southern railway. From 25th February 2021, it will run with 1 more additional coach, i.e., AC Three Tier Economy.

Overview
This train was inaugurated on 3 November 2017, as weekly frequency train service. It was Flagged off by Piyush Goyal (Minister of Railways) and Edappadi K. Palaniswami (Chief Minister of Tamil Nadu), For making less time and comfortable journey for Chennai and Madurai Commuters.

Coach Composition

Till June 2020, 20601/02 MAS - MDU - MAS AC Express had following Coach Position when it ran with ICF Coaches, 

 1 AC First Class
 2 AC Two Tier
 9 AC Three Tier
 2 Power Cum Generator Cars

After receiving LHB rakes it had revised composition, 

 1 AC First Cum AC Two Tier
 2 AC Two Tier
 9 AC Three Tier
 2 End On Generator Cars. 

From September 2021 it had been attached with 4 Sleeper Classes and the name AC Express had been withdrawn, and was called as Central Express. Till 24rth February 2022, it had following Coach composition, 

20601/20602 Chennai Central - Madurai Junction Central SF Express has, 

 1 AC First Cum AC Two Tier
 2 AC Two Tier
 9 AC Three Tier
 4 Sleeper Class
 2 End On Generator Cars

At Present it runs with following Coach composition, 

 1 AC First Cum AC Two Tier
 2 AC Two Tier
 7 AC Three Tier
 2 AC Three Tier Economy
 1 Luggage Cum Disabled Coach
 1 End on Generator Car

Routes

Halts

When it ran as 12277/78 Chennai Central - Madurai Duronto AC SF Express it has its stoppage only at, 

 Salem Junction

Now 20601/02 Central SF Express has stoppages at, 

 Katpadi
 Salem
 Karur
 Dindigul

20602 Has additional stoppage at Perambur, to avoid rushing in Central.

Traction
WAP-4 & WAP-7 of Arakkonam, Royapuram & Erode loco shed pulls this train at both directions.

Demands 
There are also demands to stop this train at Namakkal, Jolarpettai, Arakkonam, Thiruvallur and Perambur Railway stations.

References

AC Express (Indian Railways) trains
Transport in Chennai
Transport in Madurai
Rail transport in Tamil Nadu